The VEB Deutsche Schallplatten was the monopolistic music publisher in the German Democratic Republic from the 1950s until the 1980s.

On August 12, 1946, the German singer and actor Ernst Busch got permission by Soviet military administration to institute a publishing house for music.

On February 3, 1947, Busch started the company Lied Der Zeit GmbH with the music labels Amiga, Eterna and Lied Der Zeit.

On April 1, 1953, the private GmbH-company had to change to a state-controlled VEB (Volkseigener Betrieb, "People-owned enterprise").

On March 18, 1955, the VEB Lied Der Zeit was renamed to VEB Deutsche Schallplatten Berlin.

In 1990, it became Deutsche Schallplatten GmbH Berlin (DSB). 

Labels of VEB Deutsche Schallplatten:
 Amiga for contemporary pop, rock music and jazz
 Eterna for classical music, operas, operettas
 Litera for radio plays, poetry readings
 Nova for contemporary art music
 Aurora for workers' songs and productions by Ernst Busch
 Schola for educational material

After 1990, some of these labels were sold to other music companies.

See also 
 List of record labels
 UC compander, a noise reduction system undocumentedly used on many DMM vinyl records by Eterna, Amiga and Nova in the 1980s.

External links
 http://www.discogs.com/label/Deutsche+Schallplatten+Berlin

Volkseigene Betriebe
Record labels established in 1946
German record labels
1946 establishments in Germany
State-owned record labels